Across the River to Motor City is a Canadian television drama series, that aired on Citytv stations. It debuted November 22, 2007. The series is about an insurance investigator named Ben Ford who works the border in both Detroit and Windsor.  The story takes into account the shifting allegiances and ambitions that straddle the Detroit/Windsor boundary, an urban portion of the Canada/United States border.

Benjamin Ford's 30th birthday happens to fall on a fateful day: November 22, 1963, the day of the Kennedy assassination.  Coincidentally, it is also the day that his flight attendant girlfriend, Katie, disappears on a flight back from Dallas.

The mystery of what happened to her, and why, consumes the life of Ben Ford; it eventually involves his adult daughter, Kathleen, when Katie's body turns up 40 years later. Family mysteries and intrigue play out against a backdrop of some of the more momentous events of recent American and Canadian history.

The six-episode series was shot in Canada in the Ontario cities of Hamilton, Toronto, and Windsor, as well as in the United States in the Michigan city of Detroit.

In April, 2008, Across The River To Motor City won a Canadian Screenwriting Award for Best Dramatic Writing for Denis McGrath and Robert Wertheimer.

On August 26, 2008, Across the River to Motor City was nominated for 7 Gemini Awards, including Best Dramatic Miniseries, Best Lead Actor (David Fox) and Best Writing in a Dramatic Miniseries.

Cast
Sasha Roiz  — Ben Ford
Anne Openshaw  — Kathleen Ford-McNeal
Joe Pingue  — Young Del Sherman
Charlotte Sullivan  — Katie Wilton
Matthew Deslippe  — Frank Calasso
Peter Stebbings  — Brett McNeal
Alan C. Peterson  — Angelo Boudreau
Raven Dauda  — Jessie Preacher
Howard Jerome  — Old Del Sherman
David Fox  — Benjamin Ford
Anand Rajaram — Detective Singh
 Victor Gomez — Young Rafael Padron
Lenno Britos — Old Rafael Padron
Dylan Authors — Hunter McNeal
Sean Sullivan — Detective Lewis
David Ferry  — Giovanni Rizanno
Tara Nicodemo — Lorraine Calasso
Siobhan Murphy — Marie Hart
Jessica Greco — Samantha Porter
Stefano DiMatteo — Salvador Cruz
Mitchell Nye  Frank Calasso Jr.
Darryn Lucio  — Nick Delgado
Mike 'Nug' Nahrgang  —  Monk
Lorry Ayers  — Sheila Wilkins

References

External links
 

2000s Canadian drama television series
2007 Canadian television series debuts
2007 Canadian television series endings
Citytv original programming
Television shows set in Detroit
Television shows set in Ontario
2000s Canadian television miniseries